The Copa EuroAmericana was a friendly football exhibition tournament created by DirecTV that took place in the Americas. Some clubs from CONCACAF, CONMEBOL and UEFA were invited to participate in it. Since 2014, matches corresponding to Spanish teams also served as the LFP World Challenge.

Format
Each match was played for 90 minutes. In case of a draw after the 90 minutes, the winners were determined via a penalty shoot-out. The confederation of the winning team of each match was awarded with a point, and the confederation with most points at the end of the tournament was declared champions.

Winners

See also 
 Supercopa Euroamericana

References

External links 
Copa EuroAmericana: Official site
Footballzz.co.uk: Copa EuroAmericana 2013

 
Association football friendly trophies
Recurring sporting events established in 2013
Recurring sporting events disestablished in 2015